James Judd (born 30 October 1949, Hertford) is a British conductor.

James Judd grew up in Hertford, learning the piano, flute and organ as a child and discovering his talent for conducting at high school. He studied at the Trinity College of Music in London.

After graduating Judd was an assistant conductor of The Cleveland Orchestra under Lorin Maazel, after which he served as associate music director of the European Union Youth Orchestra under Claudio Abbado.  Judd made his U.S. opera debut in 1988 conducting Don Giovanni for the Florida Grand Opera.  Judd was the last full-time music director of the Florida Philharmonic, from 1987 to 2001.  In 2013, Judd was appointed music director of The Little Orchestra Society.  Judd is the founder of Miami Music Project, a non profit organization, which provides music education to children inspirated on an El Sistema-style model.

Judd was appointed music director of the New Zealand Symphony Orchestra (NZSO), the first NZSO conductor with that title, in 1999. He held that position until 2007.  He conducted several recordings with the NZSO for the Naxos label, and led the NZSO in its first-ever appearance at The Proms and Concertgebouw in Amsterdam in 2005.  Judd now holds the title of Music Director Emeritus of the NZSO.

In 2014, Judd became music director of the Israel Symphony Orchestra Rishon LeZion.  He offered to waive his salary in 2015, in the wake of financial difficulties at the orchestra.

In September 2016, Judd was appointed artistic director and principal conductor of the Daejeon Philharmonic Orchestra in Korea. He concluded his artistic directorship of the orchestra as of the close of the 2021–2022 season.

He became chief conductor of the Slovak Philharmonic Orchestra as of the 2017–2018 season. As of 2019 he was scheduled to conclude his chief conductorship of the orchestra as of the close of the 2020–2021 season.

Judd has returned to New Zealand to live while holding the position of artistic director and principal conductor of the Daejeon Philharmonic Orchestra in South Korea.

Judd and his wife Valerie, a former member of the New World Symphony Orchestra, have a daughter.

References

External links
 James Judd official website
 James Judd biography and discography at Naxos.com
 NZSO biography of Judd
 AllMusic page on James Judd
 Interview with James Judd, August 13, 1999

British male conductors (music)
1949 births
Living people
21st-century British conductors (music)
20th-century British conductors (music)
Alumni of Trinity College of Music
New Zealand Symphony Orchestra people
People from Hertford
20th-century British male musicians
21st-century British male musicians